Moravian Wallachia (or simply Valašsko) is a mountainous ethnoregion located in the easternmost part of Moravia in the Czech Republic, near the Slovak border, roughly centered on the cities Vsetín, Valašské Meziříčí and Rožnov pod Radhoštěm. The name Wallachia used to be applied to all the highlands of Moravia and the neighboring Silesia, although in the 19th century a smaller area came to be defined as ethno-cultural Moravian Wallachia. The traditional dialect  represents a mixture of elements from the Czech and Slovak languages, and has a distinct lexicon of Romanian origin relating to the pastoral economy of the highlands. The name originated from the term "Vlach", the exonym of Romanians.

Geography and anthropology
 
Moravian Wallachia is a mountainous region located in the easternmost part of Moravia in the Czech Republic, near the Slovak border, roughly centered on the cities Vsetín, Valašské Meziříčí and Rožnov pod Radhoštěm. It is part of the Western Carpathians.

It is bordered to the west with Lachia along the Štramberk–Příbor–Frýdek line (according to Šembera) or according to dialectology (according to František Bartoš).

Culture
 
The population is traditionally pastoralist. Although animal husbandry was long associated with agriculture practiced in the lowlands adjacent to the Western Carpathians, the Vlach methods and associated rituals of sheep and goat tending were unique and newly introduced by them, as were the introduction of grazing in the highlands and the emphasis upon the production of milk and cheese (bryndza). The "Vlach" dress are still important elements of the ethnography of the Czech Republic, Slovakia and Poland. The music of the area is thought to have been influenced by the Vlachs (e.g. see Lachian Dances), but it also represents a locally vibrant mixture of Vlach with Slovak, Czech, German, and Polish music cultures from the Tatras and Morava valley.

History

Origin
It is unclear exactly why and when the Vlach migrations into what is today Czech Republic and Slovakia occurred. According to Lozovan, the Vlachs were at first Romance-speaking, Orthodox Christian, transhumant pastoralists originating in Transylvania. Kamusella notes that Vlachs migrated up along the Carpathians to Moravia between the 13th and 18th centuries and that most preserved Orthodox Christianity but were Slavicized.

Early modern period
 
The Vlachs in eastern Moravia rose up during the Thirty Years' War (1618–48). They fought successfully against Habsburg rule in 1620–23, and were initially supported by rebellious Protestant Hungarians. Having had all of Moravia east of the Morava river under their control by 1621, the Vlachs were defeated in 1623, after which a series of public executions took place. They renewed attacks in late 1623, and notably defeated a Polish contingent in March 1624. In 1625–30 Habsburg and Danish armies repeatedly crossed Moravia. The Vlachs joined the Danes, and later, the Swedes. After the Danish retreat in 1627, and Swedish retreat in 1643, the Habsburgs finally defeated the Vlachs in 1644.

Modern period
From at least the mid-18th century the populace of Moravian Wallachia described itself as Wallachian. At that time, in German, the community was known as die Wallachey.  replaced the term Ualachy (Vlahi) with Ualassko (Valasko), and defined the Moravian Wallach as a shepherd, and stressed that the term had nothing to do with Romanians. He noted that the speech was of elements of Polish and East Slavic dialects.

In 1866, Hyde Clarke reported that the Moravians viewed the Moravian Vlachs (Wallachians) as an "alien race", but Slavic-speaking. They had characteristic habits and dress.

Notable people

Leoš Janáček - famous music composer
Milan Baroš - football player
Jan Antonín Baťa - businessman, shoemaker (Bata Shoes)
Tomáš Baťa - shoemaker
Tomáš Berdych - professional tennis player
Radoslav Brzobohatý - Czech actor
Ota Filip - novelist, journalist, published in Czech and German
Bohuslav Fuchs - pioneer of modern architecture
Alois Hába - composer
Markéta Irglová - singer-songwriter, Academy Award winner
Boleslav Polívka - actor
Tom Stoppard - British author and playwright
Ivana Trump - American business woman, ex-wife of Donald Trump
Mirek Topolánek - former Czech Prime Minister
Ludvík Vaculík - Czech writer and co-author of Charter 77 (with Jan Patočka and Václav Havel)
Emil Zátopek - long-distance runner best known for winning three gold medals at the 1952 Summer Olympics in Helsinki

See also

Hutsuls
Boykos
Lemkos
Gorals
Moravian Slovakia
Kingdom of Wallachia

References

Further reading

Eckert, Eva. (1993). Varieties of Czech: Studies in Czech Sociolinguistic. Atlanta/Amsterodam, Rodopi. p. 53-54
Short, D. (1993). Czech Republic and Slovak Republic: language situation. In: Asher R.E. (ed.) The Encyclopedia of Language and Linguistic, Oxford, vol. 2, 804-805
A Group of co-authors (2007): Přírodou a historií Valašskomeziříčska po naučných stezkách (Around the Nature and History of Valašské Meziřičí county), Valašské Meziříčí, Český svaz ochránců přírody. 66 Pages. .(in Czech)

External links
https://web.archive.org/web/20100503172548/http://www.vsacan.cz/en/ Vsacan, a Wallachian song and dance ensemble.

 
Moravia
History of Eastern Romance people
Western Carpathians